Philip (or Philips) Galle (1537 – March 1612) was a Dutch publisher, best known for publishing old master prints, which he also produced as designer and engraver. He is especially known for his reproductive engravings of paintings.

Life

Galle was born in Haarlem in the Netherlands, where he was a pupil of the humanist and engraver Dirck Volkertsz. Coornhert. According to the RKD, he married Catharina van Rollant on 9 June 1569. They had five children who later became active as artists: Theodoor, Cornelis, Philips II, Justa (who married the engraver Adriaen Collaert) and Catharina (who married the engraver Karel de Mallery).

In Haarlem he engraved several works of the Haarlem painter Maarten van Heemskerck. Even while he worked from 1557 for the Antwerp publisher Hieronymus Cock, he established himself as an independent printer in Haarlem in 1563, where he made prints after Johannes Stradanus and Maerten de Vos. In 1569 the series of Counts of Holland and Zeeland was published, a series of six engravings which he made in Haarlem with Willem Thibaut, just before moving to Antwerp somewhere near the end of 1569 or the start of 1570, probably to avoid the Siege of Haarlem.

His first house in Antwerp was most probably a house called Het Gulden Hert (The Golden Deer), opposite the house of the mapmaker Ortels (also known as Ortelius). He managed Cock's press and succeeded Cock in 1570 and was received as a citizen of Antwerp the following year.  The work contains an approbatio, or permission from the ecclesiastical (Roman Catholic) authorities to publish. Galle had a difficult relationship with religion and political power during his entire life. He was a friend of the Antwerp printer Christopher Plantin and perhaps part of the secretive humanist circle of the Familia Caritatis (Family of Love), which makes it difficult to place him as Catholic or Protestant during the Dutch Revolt.

Some of his numerous prints made in Antwerp were after Anthonie van Blocklandt, Hans Bol, Marcus Gheeraerts, Gerard Groening, and Hans Vredeman de Vries. Galle had many pupils who became popular engravers. The map engraver Cornelis de Hooghe (or Hogius), who later died a gruesome death when he was beheaded and quartered in the Hague because of a conspiracy against the state, received his education when Galle still lived in Haarlem, while De Hooghe already worked for himself at the moment Galle moved to Antwerp.

Galle's son Cornelis followed him as an engraver. Early works by Cornelis shows a striking similarity to the work of his father.

Philip Galle's press and publishing house was a success. His pupils included his children, de Hooghe, Hendrick Goltzius, Jan Baptist Barbé, Pieter Nagel, the sons of his colleague Hans Collaert Adriaen and Jan, and Karel van Mallery. His sons and sons-in-law carried on the business at Antwerp through the seventeenth century.

Writings
As a resident of Antwerp, Galle witnessed numerous events of the Eighty Years War, notably the siege and looting of the town in 1576 by the Spaniards, called "The Spanish Fury". Galle wrote a Cort Verhael, a short chronicle of these events, which was published around the end of 1578. This booklet, which included several maps, was dedicated to archduke Matthias of Austria, a relative of the legal king Philip II of Spain, but not recognised by him as a landvoogd or supervisor of the country. A later print was dedicated to Jean de Bourgogne, lord of Froidmont or Fromont. This rather personal book, which was translated in several languages soon after its first publication, shows Galle as a peace-loving person who intended to stay far away from the political and military turmoil of his era.

Death
He died in Antwerp in March 1612.

Gallery
Pictures from the Theatri Orbis Terrarum Enchiridion 1585

Engravings attributed to Galle

Notes

References 
 Philips Galle (1537–1612): engraver and print publisher in Haarlem and Antwerp, by Manfred Stefan Sellink, 1997.
 Den Haag in den Geuzentijd; by Jakob Smit, Uitgegeven met steun van de Vereeniging "Die Haghe" MCMXXII, 1922, pp. 330–334.

External links 

 Book plates of fish by Collaert Peacay's BibliOdyssey blog
 Liège University (Belgium) Webpage on Philip Galle
 Jewish National & University Library Digital version of: Theatri orbis terrarum enchiridion / minoribus tabulis per Philippum Gallaeum exaratum.
 Website on Cornelis de Hooghe
 Engravings of Coleccion Espinola
 Live of Virgin Mariae Coleccion Espínola
 Icones Illustrivm Feminarvm Veteris Testamenti
 Icones Illustrivm Feminarvm Novi Testamenti
 

1537 births
1612 deaths
Artists from Haarlem
Dutch printers
Dutch Golden Age printmakers
16th-century engravers
17th-century engravers
Flemish engravers
Renaissance engravers